The 2022 Stanford Cardinal baseball team represented Stanford University in the 2022 NCAA Division I baseball season. The Cardinal played their home games at Klein Field at Sunken Diamond under fifth year coach David Esquer.

Previous season
The Cardinal finished the regular season with a record of 33–14 and a conference record of 17–10. They earned the #9 national seed and the right to host a regional. They won their regional, and they won their Super Regional series against Texas Tech. The Cardinal earned a spot in the College World Series, but they lost two of three games and were knocked out ending their season with an overall record of 39–17.

2021 MLB Draft
The Cardinal had nine players drafted in the 2021 MLB draft.

Recruits

Personnel

Roster
{| class="toccolours" style="text-align: left; font-size:90%;"
|-
! colspan="9" style="; text-align:center;"| 2022 Stanford Cardinal roster
|-
|width="03"| 
|valign="top"|
Pitchers
13 – Justin Moore – Junior
18 – Cody Jensen – Junior
20 – Nathan Fleischli – Junior
23 – Joey Dixon – Sophomore
26 – Quinn Mathews – Junior
28 – Alex Williams – Senior
30 – Brandt Pancer – Sophomore
34 – Ryan Bruno – Sophomore
36 – Ty Uber – Freshman
37 – Tommy O'Rourke – Sophomore
40 – Nicolas Lopez – Junior
41 – Matt Swartz – Sophomore
45 – Max Meier – Junior
46 – Jaden Bruno – Freshman
49 – Drew Dowd – Sophomore
50 – Gavin Nalu – Freshman

|width="15"| 
|valign="top"|
Catchers
11 – Alberto Rios – Sophomore
16 – Vincent Martinez – Senior
21 – Charlie Saum – Freshman
25 – Kody Huff – Junior

Infielders
1 – Owen Cobb – Junior
2 – Drew Bowser – Sophomore
5 – Austin Kretzschmar – Senior
10 – Adam Crampton – Junior
24 – Trevor Haskins – Freshman
27 – Temo Becerra – Freshman
31 – Carter Graham – Sophomore33 – Brett Barrera – Junior|width="15"| 
| valign="top" |
Outfielders
4 – Saborn Campbell – Freshman7 – Brock Jones – Junior15 – Grant Burton – Senior22 – Eddie Park – Sophomore29 – Cole Hinkleman – Junior42 – Joe Lomuscio – Graduate StudentUtility
6 – Braden Montgomery (OF/P) – Freshman12 – Tommy Troy (INF/OF) – Sophomore19 – Harry Gargus (INF/OF) – Junior44 – Brett Blair (INF/OF) – Freshman39 – Jake Sapien (P/INF) – Freshman''

|width="25"| 
|}

Coaching staff

Pac–12 media poll

Preseason All-Americans

Award watch lists

Schedule and results

! colspan=2 style="" | Regular Season
|- valign="top"

|- align="center" bgcolor="bbffbb"
|Feb. 18 || * || No. 6 || Klein Field at Sunken Diamond • Stanford, CA ||  W 1–0|| Williams (1–0) || Repetti (0–1) || Montgomery (1) || Stanford Live Stream2 || 913 || 1–0 ||
|- align="center" bgcolor="ffdddd"
|Feb. 19 || Cal State Fullerton* || No. 6 || Klein Field at Sunken Diamond • Stanford, CA ||  L 0–11 || Stultz (1–0) || Mathews (0–1) ||  || Stanford Live Stream2 || 2,304 || 1–1 ||
|- align="center" bgcolor="bbffbb"
|Feb. 20 || Cal State Fullerton* || No. 6 || Klein Field at Sunken Diamond • Stanford, CA || W 11–1 || Dowd (1–0) || Rodriguez (0–1) ||  || Stanford Live Stream2 || 1,488 || 2–1 ||
|- align="center" bgcolor="bbffbb"
|Feb. 22 || * || No. 6 || Klein Field at Sunken Diamond • Stanford, CA || W 5–0 || Uber (1–0) || Reelfs (0–1) ||  || Pac-12 Bay Area || 1,203 || 3–1 ||
|-
! colspan=12 style="padding-left:4em;background:#8C1515; color:white" | Karbach Round Rock Classic
|- align="center" bgcolor="bbffbb"
|Feb. 25|| vs. Louisiana* || No. 6 || Dell Diamond • Round Rock, TX || W 5–1 || Williams (2–0) || Ray (0–1) ||  || FloBaseball ||  || 4–1 ||
|- align="center" bgcolor="bbffbb"
|Feb. 27|| vs. Indiana* || No. 6 || Dell Diamond • Round Rock, TX|| W 13–0 || Dowd (2–0) || Sharp (0–1) || Dixon (1) || FloBaseball ||  || 5–1 ||
|- align="center" bgcolor="bbffbb"
|Feb. 27|| vs. No. 2 Arkansas* || No. 6 || Dell Diamond • Round Rock, TX|| W 5–0 || Mathews (1–1) || Smith (1–1) ||  || FloBaseball ||  || 6–1 ||
|-
! colspan=12 style="padding-left:4em;background:#8C1515; color:white" |
|- align="center" bgcolor="ffdddd"
|Feb. 28 || at UTSA* || No. 6 || Roadrunner Field • San Antonio, TX || L 5–610 || Chomko (1–0) || O'Rourke (0–1) ||  || Live Stream || 408 || 6–2 ||
|-

|- align="center" bgcolor="ffdddd"
|Mar. 4 || * || No. 6 || Klein Field at Sunken Diamond • Stanford, CA || L 3–9 || Traxel (2–1) || Williams (2–1) ||  || Stanford Live Stream || 805 || 6–3 ||
|- align="center" bgcolor="bbffbb"
|Mar. 5 || Cal State Northridge* || No. 6 || Klein Field at Sunken Diamond • Stanford, CA || W 6–2 || Mathews (2–1) || Sodersten (2–1) ||  || Stanford Live Stream || 1,149 || 7–3 ||
|- align="center" bgcolor="bbffbb"
|Mar. 6 || Cal State Northridge* || No. 6 || Klein Field at Sunken Diamond • Stanford, CA || W 3–2 || Dixon (1–0) || Wentz (1–1) || Montgomery (2) || Stanford Live Stream || 1,161 || 8–3 ||
|- align="center" bgcolor="ffdddd"
|Mar. 11 || Oregon || No. 5 || Klein Field at Sunken Diamond • Stanford, CA || L 3–4 || Churby (1–0) || O'Rourke (0–2) || Somers (1) || Stanford Live Stream || 1,309 || 8–4 || 0–1
|- align="center" bgcolor="ffdddd"
|Mar. 12 || Oregon || No. 5 || Klein Field at Sunken Diamond • Stanford, CA || L 13–16 || Britton (2–0) || Montgomery (0–1) ||  || Stanford Live Stream || 1,511 || 8–5 || 0–2
|- align="center" bgcolor="bbffbb"
|Mar. 13 || Oregon || No. 5 || Klein Field at Sunken Diamond • Stanford, CA || W 10–6 || Dowd (3–0) || Brandenburg (1–1) ||  || Stanford Live Stream || 1,603 || 9–5 || 1–2
|- align="center" bgcolor="ffdddd"
|Mar. 19 || at No. 16 Arizona || No. 12 || Hi Corbett Field • Tucson, AZ || L 2–3 || Nichols (3–0) || O'Rourke (0–3) || Long (1) || P12N || 4,330 || 9–6 || 1–3
|- align="center" bgcolor="ffdddd"
|Mar. 20 || at No. 16 Arizona || No. 12 || Hi Corbett Field • Tucson, AZ || L 5–6 || Christian (2–1) || Dixon (1–1) ||  || P12N (Arizona) || 3,305 || 9–7 || 1–4
|- align="center" bgcolor="ffdddd"
|Mar. 21 || at No. 16 Arizona || No. 12 || Hi Corbett Field • Tucson, AZ || L 3–10 || Flanagan (3–1) || Uber (1–1) ||  || P12N || 2,618 || 9–8 || 1–5
|- align="center" bgcolor="bbffbb"
|Mar. 25 ||  ||  || Klein Field at Sunken Diamond • Stanford, CA || W 8–712  || Bruno (1–0) || Kaelber (0–1) ||  || Stanford Live Stream || 1,179 || 10–8 || 2–5
|- align="center" bgcolor="bbffbb"
|Mar. 26 || Washington State ||  || Klein Field at Sunken Diamond • Stanford, CA || W 7–1 || Mathews (3–1) || McMillan (1–2) ||  || Stanford Live Stream || 1,313 || 11–8 || 3–5
|- align="center" bgcolor="bbffbb"
|Mar. 27 || Washington State ||  || Klein Field at Sunken Diamond • Stanford, CA || W 8–3 || Dowd (4–0) || Cottrell (1–5) ||  || Stanford Live Stream || 1,274 || 12–8 || 4–5
|-

|- align="center" bgcolor="bbffbb"
|Apr. 1 || at No. 3 Oregon State ||  || Goss Stadium at Coleman Field • Corvallis, OR || W 1–010 || Dixon (2–1) || Sebby (1–1) || Mathews (1) || P12N (Oregon) || 3,756 || 13–8 || 5–5
|- align="center" bgcolor="ffdddd"
|Apr. 2 || at No. 3 Oregon State ||  || Goss Stadium at Coleman Field • Corvallis, OR || L 2–311 || Brown (3–0) || Dixon (2–2) ||  || P12N || 3,918 || 13–9 || 5–6
|- align="center" bgcolor="bbffbb"
|Apr. 3 || at No. 3 Oregon State ||  || Goss Stadium at Coleman Field • Corvallis, OR || W 8–5 || Mathews (4–1) || Verburg (2–3) ||  || P12N (Oregon) || 3,735 || 14–9 || 6–6
|- align="center" bgcolor="ffdddd"
|Apr. 5 || * ||  || Klein Field at Sunken Diamond • Stanford, CA || L 1–8 || Linchey (2–0) || Montgomery (0–2) ||  || Stanford Live Stream2 || 891 || 14–10 ||
|- align="center" bgcolor="bbffbb"
|Apr. 8 || Arizona State ||  || Klein Field at Sunken Diamond • Stanford, CA || W 8–0 || Williams (3–1) || Luckham (4–2) ||  || Stanford Live Stream2 || 1,550 || 15–10 || 7–6
|- align="center" bgcolor="bbffbb"
|Apr. 9 || Arizona State ||  || Klein Field at Sunken Diamond • Stanford, CA || W 10–6 || O'Rourke (1–3) || Levine (2–2) || Mathews (2) || Stanford Live Stream2 || 1,681 || 16–10 || 8–6
|- align="center" bgcolor="bbffbb"
|Apr. 10 || Arizona State ||  || Klein Field at Sunken Diamond • Stanford, CA || W 16–10 || Mathews (5–1) || Webster (1–3) ||  || Stanford Live Stream || 1,969 || 17–10 || 9–6
|- align="center" bgcolor="bbffbb"
|Apr. 12 || * || No. 22 || Klein Field at Sunken Diamond • Stanford, CA || W 6–5 || Bruno (2–0) || Lombard (2–3) ||  || Stanford Live Stream || 969 || 18–10 ||
|- align="center" bgcolor="bbffbb"
|Apr. 14 || at No. 12 UCLA || No. 22 || Jackie Robinson Stadium • Los Angeles, CA || W 9–1 || Williams (4–1) || Brooks (5–3) ||  || P12N || 641 || 19–10 || 10–6
|- align="center" bgcolor="ffdddd"
|Apr. 15 || at No. 12 UCLA || No. 22 || Jackie Robinson Stadium • Los Angeles, CA || L 4–5 || Flanagan (3–0) || O'Rourke (1–4) ||  || ESPN2 || 1,494 || 19–11 || 10–7
|- align="center" bgcolor="bbffbb"
|Apr. 16 || at No. 12 UCLA || No. 22 || Jackie Robinson Stadium • Los Angeles, CA || W 11–0 || Mathews (6–1) || Jump (1–1) ||  || P12N || 1,334 || 20–11 || 11–7
|- align="center" bgcolor="bbffbb"
|Apr. 19 || at * || No. 7 || Baggett Stadium • San Luis Obispo, CA || W 10–8 || Jensen (1–0) || Larkin (2–2) || Bruno (1) || ESPN+ || 2,738 || 21–11 || 
|- align="center" bgcolor="bbffbb"
|Apr. 22 || vs. * || No. 7 || Tony Gwynn Stadium • San Diego, CA || W 11–1 || Williams (5–1) || Avitia (4–4) ||  ||  || 219 || 22–11 || 
|- align="center" bgcolor="ffdddd"
|Apr. 23 || vs. Grand Canyon* || No. 7 || Tony Gwynn Stadium • San Diego, CA || L 1–5 || Reilly (5–1) || O'Rourke (1–5) ||  ||  || 311 || 22–12 ||
|- align="center" bgcolor="bbffbb"
|Apr. 23 || at * || No. 7 || Tony Gwynn Stadium • San Diego, CA || W 9–6 || Uber (2–1) || Fondtain (1–5) || Mathews (3) ||  || 712 || 23–12 ||
|- align="center" bgcolor="bbffbb"
|Apr. 24 || at San Diego State* || No. 7 || Tony Gwynn Stadium • San Diego, CA || W 6–4 || Bruno (3–0) || Guzman (1–3) ||  ||  || 822 || 24–12 ||
|- align="center" bgcolor="ffdddd"
|Apr. 29 || at  || No. 6 || Husky Ballpark • Seattle, WA ||  L 3–4 || Raeth (5–4) || Dixon (2–3) ||  || Washington Live Stream-2 || 908 || 24–13 || 11–8
|- align="center" bgcolor="bbffbb"
|Apr. 30 || at Washington || No. 6 || Husky Ballpark • Seattle, WA || W 6–2 || Dowd (5–0) || Kirchoff (2–3) || Pancer (1) || Washington Live Stream-2 || 1,332 || 25–13 || 12–8
|-

|- align="center" bgcolor="ffdddd"
|May 1 || at Washington || No. 6 || Husky Ballpark • Seattle, WA || L 10–11 || Velazquez (1–0) || Bruno (3–1) ||  || Washington Live Stream-2 || 1,210 || 25–14 || 12–9
|- align="center" bgcolor="bbffbb"
|May 3 || * || No. 11 || Klein Field at Sunken Diamond • Stanford, CA || W 16–6 || Dixon (3–3) || Riccomini (1–5) ||  || Stanford Live Stream || 948 || 26–14 ||
|- align="center" bgcolor="bbffbb"
|May 6 || California || No. 11 || Klein Field at Sunken Diamond • Stanford, CA || W 6–2 || Williams (6–1) || Zobac (2–3) ||  || P12N Bay Area || 2,242 || 27–14 || 13–9
|- align="center" bgcolor="bbffbb"
|May 7 || California || No. 11 || Klein Field at Sunken Diamond • Stanford, CA || W 8–7 || Mathews (7–1) || White (1–6) ||  || P12N Bay Area || 2,634 || 28–14 || 14–9
|- align="center" bgcolor="bbffbb"
|May 8 || California || No. 11 || Klein Field at Sunken Diamond • Stanford, CA || W 11–3 || Uber (3–1) || Stoutenborough (2–3) ||  || P12N Bay Area || 1,725 || 29–14 || 15–9
|- align="center" bgcolor="bbffbb"
|May 10 || at San Francisco || No. 9 || Dante Benedetti Diamond at Max Ulrich Field • San Francisco, CA || W 9–7 || Meier (1–0) || Washburn (0–1) || Mathews (4) || WCC Ntwork || 127 || 30–14 ||
|- align="center" bgcolor="bbffbb"
|May 13 || at  || No. 9 || Smith's Ballpark • Salt Lake City, UT || W 5–0 || Williams (7–1) || Sox (4–4) ||  || Pac-12 Insider || 1,454 || 31–14 || 16–9
|- align="center" bgcolor="bbffbb"
|May 14 || at Utah || No. 9 || Smith's Ballpark • Salt Lake City, UT || W 8–2 || Dixon (4–3) || Harris (1–3) ||  || Utah Live Stream || 1,517 || 32–14 || 17–9
|- align="center" bgcolor="bbffbb"
|May 15 || at Utah || No. 9 || Smith's Ballpark • Salt Lake City, UT || W 7–6 || Mathews (8–1) || McCleve (2–2) ||  || Utah Live Stream || 1,312 || 33–14 || 18–9
|- align="center" bgcolor="bbffbb"
|May 17 || Santa Clara* || No. 4 || Stephen Schott Stadium • Santa Clara, CA || W 19–0 || O'Rourke (2–5) || Reelfs (4–7) ||  ||  || 476 || 34–14 ||
|- align="center" bgcolor="bbffbb"
|May 19 || USC || No. 4 || Klein Field at Sunken Diamond • Stanford, CA || W 7–1 || Williams (8–1) || Agassi (3–2) ||  || P12N Bay Area || 1,598 || 35–14 || 19–9
|- align="center" bgcolor="bbffbb"
|May 20 || USC || No. 4 || Klein Field at Sunken Diamond • Stanford, CA || W 22–3 || Dixon (5–3) || Esqueda (1–6) ||  || P12N || 1,707 || 36–14 || 20–9
|- align="center" bgcolor="bbffbb"
|May 21 || USC || No. 4 || Klein Field at Sunken Diamond • Stanford, CA || W 12–5 || Dowd (6–0) || Hurley (6–2) || Mathews (5) || P12N Bay Area || 1,989 || 37–14 || 21–9
|-

! style="" | Postseason
|- valign="top"

|- align="center" bgcolor="bbffbb"
|May 25 || (8) Arizona State || No. 3 (1) || Scottsdale Stadium • Scottsdale, AZ || W 6–3 || Bruno (4–1) || Pivaroff (1–3) || Mathews (6) || P12N || 2,044 || 38–14 || 1–0
|- align="center" bgcolor="bbffbb"
|May 26 || (5) Arizona || No. 3 (1) || Scottsdale Stadium • Scottsdale, AZ || W 15–8 || Pancer (1–0) || Irvin (4–4) ||  || P12N || 3,174 || 39–14 || 2–0
|-
|- align="center" bgcolor="bbffbb"
|May 28 || (5) Arizona || No. 3 (1) || Scottsdale Stadium • Scottsdale, AZ || W 5–4 || Dixon (6–3) || Susac (4–3) || Mathews (7) || P12N || 3,321 || 40–14 || 3–0
|-
|- align="center" bgcolor="bbffbb"
|May 29 || No. 4 (2) Oregon State || No. 3 (1) || Scottsdale Stadium • Scottsdale, AZ || W 9–5 || Bruno (5–1) || Sebby (1–2) || Pancer (2) || ESPN2 || 4,024 || 41–14 || 4–0
|-

|- align="center" bgcolor="bbffbb"
|June 3 || (4)  || No. 2 (1) || Klein Field at Sunken Diamond • Stanford, CA || W 20–7 || O'Rourke (3–5) || Babalis (4–7) ||  || ESPN+ || 1,744 || 42–14 || 1–0
|- align="center" bgcolor="ffdddd"
|June 4 || (2) Texas State || No. 2 (1) || Klein Field at Sunken Diamond • Stanford, CA || L 2–5 || Wells (9–1) || Williams (8–2) || Stivors (18) || ESPNU || 2,456 || 42–15 || 1–1
|- align="center" bgcolor="bbffbb"
|June 5 || (3) UC Santa Barbara || No. 2 (1) || Klein Field at Sunken Diamond • Stanford, CA || W 8–4 || Mathews (9–1) || Welch (4–4) ||  || ESPN+ || 1,774 || 43–15 || 2–1
|- align="center" bgcolor="bbffbb"
|June 5 || (2) Texas State || No. 2 (1) || Klein Field at Sunken Diamond • Stanford, CA || W 8–4 || Uber (4–1) || Robie (4–1) ||  || ESPNU || 1,615 || 44–15 || 3–1
|- align="center" bgcolor="bbffbb"
|June 6 || (2) Texas State || No. 2 (1) || Klein Field at Sunken Diamond • Stanford, CA || W 4–3 || Pancer (2–0) || Wells (8–3) ||  || ESPN2 || 2,647 || 45–15 || 4–1

|- align="center" bgcolor="ffdddd"
|June 11 || UConn || No. 2 || Klein Field at Sunken Diamond • Stanford, CA || L 12–13 || Gallagher (11–3) || Williams (8–3) ||  || ESPNU || 2,673 || 45–16 || 0–1
|- align="center" bgcolor="bbffbb"
|June 12 || UConn || No. 2 || Klein Field at Sunken Diamond • Stanford, CA || W 8–2 || Pancer (3–0) || Peterson (11–3) || Mathews (8) || ESPN2 || 2,756 || 46–16 || 1–1
|- align="center" bgcolor="bbffbb"
|June 12 || UConn || No. 2 || Klein Field at Sunken Diamond • Stanford, CA || W 10–5 || Bruno (6–1) || Coe (2–2) || Mathews (9) || ESPN2 || 2,689 || 47–16 || 2–1

|- align="center" bgcolor="ffdddd"
|June 18 || Arkansas || No. 2 || Charles Schwab Field Omaha • Omaha, NE || L 2–17 || Noland (8–5) || Williams (8–4) ||  || ESPN || 24,337 || 47–17 || 0–1
|- align="center" bgcolor="ffdddd"
|June 20 || Auburn || No. 2 || Charles Schwab Field Omaha • Omaha, NE || L 2–6 || Bright (5–4) || Mathews''' (9–2) || Burkhalter (16) || ESPN ||  23,594 || 47–18 || 0–2

Source:
Rankings are based on the team's current ranking in the D1Baseball poll. Parentheses indicate tournament seedings.

Stanford Super Regional

College World Series

Awards and honors

Rankings

References

Stanford
Stanford Cardinal baseball seasons
Stanford Cardinal
Stanford
College World Series seasons